This is a list of museums in Guyana.

See also 
 List of museums by country
Education in Guyana
Culture of Guyana

References

Guyana
 
Guyana
Museums